The 2014–15 season was the 108th season in Sevilla FCs history, and 14th consecutive season in La Liga. The team competed in La Liga, the Copa del Rey, and the UEFA Europa League, winning the latter competition for a second consecutive year.

Players

First team squad

Transfers

Competitions

Overall

UEFA Super Cup

La Liga

League table

Results summary

Results by round

Matches

Copa del Rey

Round of 32

Round of 16

Quarter-finals

UEFA Europa League

Group stage

Knockout phase

Round of 32

Round of 16

Quarter-finals

Semi-finals

Final

Statistics

Appearances and goals
Last updated on 27 May 2015

|-
! colspan=16 style=background:#dcdcdc; text-align:center|Goalkeepers

|-
! colspan=16 style=background:#dcdcdc; text-align:center|Defenders

|-
! colspan=16 style=background:#dcdcdc; text-align:center|Midfielders

|-
! colspan=16 style=background:#dcdcdc; text-align:center|Forwards

|-
! colspan=16 style=background:#dcdcdc; text-align:center| Players who have made an appearance this season but have left the club

|-
|}

Goalscorers
This includes all competitive matches.  The list is sorted by shirt number when total goals are equal.

Last updated on 5 October 2014

References

Sevilla FC seasons
Sevilla
Sevilla
UEFA Europa League-winning seasons